Mahdi Tajik (born 1981, Tehran) is an Iranian students’ activist, journalist and political prisoner. He was arrested for the first time in 2005 by the security forces. He was also arrested by the Iranian Revolutionary Guards in 2006, for founding a student activist organization. In the same year, the Revolutionary Court sentenced him to two and a half years in prison which was reduced to cash surcharge afterwards.

For the third time, Mahdi Tajik was arrested in January 2010 and transferred to the section 350 of Evin prison. He was sentenced to 27 months of prison and 30 years of prohibition from any interview, journalism, writing articles, membership and political activity in any political parties. 
He also begins serving his sentence on 12 Feb 2013 and released on furlough on 05 Oct 2013.

Mahdi Tajik is an expert nuclear physicist and has a master's degree in North American Studies from  Tehran University Law School.

References

1981 births
People from Tehran
Iranian journalists
Iranian prisoners and detainees
Living people